Duke of Beja was an aristocratic Portuguese title and royal dukedom, associated with the Portuguese Royal House.

List of the Dukes of Beja
Infante Fernando, 2nd Duke of Viseu (1433–1470), King Duarte I's third son (second surviving); 
Infante João, 3rd Duke of Viseu (1448–1472), Infante Fernando's eldest son;
Infante Diogo, 4th Duke of Viseu (1450–1484), Infante Fernando's second son; 
King Manuel I (1469–1521), Infante Fernando's seventh son (third surviving); 
Infante Luís, Duke of Beja (1506–1555), King Manuel I's second son of his second marriage; father of King António I;
King Pedro II (1648–1706), King João IV's fourth son (second surviving in 1654);
Infante Francisco, Duke of Beja (1691–1742), King Pedro II's third son (second surviving);
King Pedro III (1717–1786), King João V's fourth son (second surviving in 1742);
King João VI (1767–1826), Queen Maria I's and King Pedro III's third son (second surviving in 1786);
King Miguel I (1802–1866), King João VI's third son (second surviving in 1816);
Infante João, Duke of Beja (1842–1861), Queen Maria II's third son;
King Manuel II (1889–1932), King Carlos I's second son.

See also
 List of Portuguese Dukedoms

References

Bibliography
"Nobreza de Portugal e do Brasil" – Vol. II, pages 409/410. Published by Zairol Lda., Lisbon 1989. 

 
Beja
Beja